Frank Cignetti Field at George P. Miller Stadium is a stadium located on the campus of Indiana University of Pennsylvania in Indiana, Pennsylvania. It is the home field for the IUP Crimson Hawks football, field hockey, and track & field teams.

The field surface is artificial turf and the stadium utilizes an Electro-Voice audio system.

In 2013, the field was named for former football head coach and College Football Hall of Fame member Frank Cignetti Sr.

See also
 Pennsylvania State Athletic Conference

References

IUP Crimson Hawks football
College football venues
American football venues in Pennsylvania
College field hockey venues in the United States
College track and field venues in the United States